Antipater Etesias (Greek: Ἀντίπατρος Ἐτησίας, Ἀntípatros Ἐtēsías) was a king of Macedon. He was the son of Cassander's brother Phillip. He became king after the death of Ptolemy Keraunos and the ousting of Meleager. His reign lasted only a period of 45 days. The Macedonians gave Antipater the name Etesias, because the etesian winds blew during the short time that he was king. He failed as the leader of the army and was deposed by Sosthenes, possibly an officer in the army of Lysimachus in the 280's or 279 BC. Despite this he still had a following in some parts of Macedon and was defeated by Antigonus II Gonatas. After this he fled to Egypt where he is mentioned 20 years later, encouraged by the king Ptolemy III Euergetes as a potential rival claimant to the Macedonian throne.

References

Sources
Pyrrhus, King of Epirus by Petros E. Garoufalias 
A History of Macedonia: Volume III, 336-167 BC by N. G. L. Hammond and F. W. Walbank (1988)

External links
Eusebius: Chronicle
St. Jerome (Hieronymus): Chronological Tables

3rd-century BC Macedonian monarchs
Ancient Macedonian monarchs
3rd-century BC rulers
Murdered royalty of Macedonia (ancient kingdom)
Antipatrid Macedonia
Year of birth unknown
Year of death unknown